Savane River may refer to:

Canada 
 Savane River (Caldwell River tributary), a tributary of the Caldwell River in Bas-Saint-Laurent, Quebec
 Little Savane River (Temiscouata Lake), a tributary of Lake Témiscouata in Bas-Saint-Laurent, Quebec (see List of rivers of Quebec#Saint John River – watershed of Madawaska River – Quebec and New Brunswick)
 Petite rivière des Savanes (Sainte-Marguerite River tributary), a tributary of the Sainte-Marguerite River in Côte-Nord, Quebec (see List of rivers of Quebec#Watershed of Saguenay River)
 Savane River (Grand Calder River tributary), a tributary of the Grand Calder River, in Chaudière-Appalaches, Quebec (see List of rivers of Quebec#Saint John River watershed – higher part (Quebec, Maine and New Brunswick))
 Savane River (Péribonka River tributary), a tributary of the Péribonka River, in Saguenay–Lac-Saint-Jean, Quebec
 Savane River (Rivière des Neiges tributary), a tributary of the Rivière des Neiges in Capitale-Nationale, Quebec
 Savane River (Vermillon River tributary), a tributary of the Vermillon River in Mauricie, Quebec (see List of rivers of Quebec#Watershed of Saint-MauriceRiver)
 Savanes River, a tributary of the Escoumins River in Côte-Nord, Quebec (see List of rivers of Quebec#North-shore tributaries downstream of Tadoussac
 Rivière Savane du Nord, a tributary of the Sainte-Anne River in Lac-Pikauba, Quebec
 Rivière-de-la-Savane, Quebec, an unorganized territory in Mauricie, Quebec
 Rivière de la Savane (île d'Orléans), a tributary of chenal des Grands Voiliers, in Saint-François-de-l'Île-d'Orléans, L'Île-d'Orléans Regional County Municipality, Capitale-Nationale, Quebec, Canada

Dominica 
 Savane River (Dominica)

See also
 Savane (disambiguation)